Darrell Wilkins (1 October 1915 – 1 January 1964) was an  Australian rules footballer who played with St Kilda in the Victorian Football League (VFL).

Notes

External links 

1915 births
1964 deaths
Australian rules footballers from Victoria (Australia)
St Kilda Football Club players
Castlemaine Football Club players